The Hong Kong Billie Jean King Cup team represents Hong Kong in the Billie Jean King Cup tennis competition and are governed by the Hong Kong Tennis Association.  They will compete in the Asia/Oceania Zone Group II in 2022.

Team members 
2015 Fed Cup Asia/Oceania Zone Group I – Pool A ties:Ling Zhang
Sher Chun-wing
Wu Ho-ching
Ng Man-ying2022 Fed Cup Asia/Oceania Zone Group II – Pool A ties:''

Eudice Chong
Adithya Karunaratne
Cody Wong Hong-yi
Wu Ho-ching
Ng Man-ying

History
Hong Kong competed in its first Fed Cup in 1981.  Their best result was reaching the round of 16 in 1982 and 1990.

See also
Fed Cup
Hong Kong Davis Cup team

External links

Billie Jean King Cup teams
Fed Cup
Fed Cup